London 2 South is an English league of Rugby Union teams, representing the second level in the Rugby Football Union's London & South East Division, making it a Level 6 league in the RFU's league hierarchy. The clubs come mainly from Hampshire, Kent, South London, Surrey and Sussex.

Promoted teams move up to London 1.

Teams 2008-2009

Previous league and season in brackets

 Basingstoke (L1 - Relegated)
 Beckenham (L2S - 7th)
 Chobham RFC (L2S - 3rd)
 Cobham RFC (L3SW - Promoted)
 Dorking RFC (L2S - 5th)
 Dover RFC (L3SE - Promoted)
 Gravesend RFC (L3SE - Promoted)
 Sidcup RFC (L2S - 6th)
 Maidstone FC (L2S - 8th)
 Old Colfeians (former pupils of Colfe's School) (L2S - 9th)
 Thanet Wanderers (L1 - Relegated)
 Tunbridge Wells RFC (L2S - 4th)

6
2